The Van Abbemuseum is a museum of modern and contemporary art in central Eindhoven, Netherlands, on the east bank of the Dommel River. Established in 1936, the museum is named after its founder, Henri van Abbe, who loved modern art and wanted to enjoy it in Eindhoven. As of 2010, the collection of the museum housed more than 2700 works of art, of which about 1000 were on paper, 700 were paintings, and 1000 were sculptures, installations and video works.

The museum has an area of 9,825 m2 and holds one of the largest collections of paintings in the world by El Lissitzky. It also has works by Pablo Picasso and Wassily Kandinsky.

History 
The museum's original collection was bought by the Eindhoven city council in 1934 in an agreement with Henri van Abbe, a private collector and local cigar manufacturer. In return for buying some of his collection, the Van Abbe factory paid for and donated the museum building, which opened in 1936. The city had architect Alexander Kropholler design a building that is a symmetrical suite of galleries in the traditionalist style. The museum name was given in publications as "Stedelijk Van Abbemuseum" until approximately 1990 and as "Van Abbemuseum" after that time.

As the building had become far too small for modern demands, a new extension to the building, including a  tower, was designed by Abel Cahen; it was inaugurated in 2003 by queen Beatrix.

Collection 
The original collection contained works by Jan Sluijters, Carel Willink and Isaac Israëls amongst others, mostly Dutch and Belgian contemporary works. The museum also bought other artworks from founder Henri van Abbe before his death in 1940.

The collection developed most under the directorships of Edy de Wilde and Rudi Fuchs. While De Wilde bought the classical modernist works by Picasso etc., Fuchs bought works from artists of his own generation, in particular conceptual work from the US and German painting.

The current director, Charles Esche has pursued a more geographically diverse collecting policy concentrating on works from central and eastern Europe including Nedko Solakov, Mladen Stilinovic, Wilhelm Sasnal, Artur Zmijewski as well as video works by Israeli artist Yael Bartana.

More recent acquisitions include pieces by Pablo Picasso, Wassily Kandinsky and Piet Mondrian. The museum is also internationally renowned for having one of the largest collections of works by El Lissitzky.

The Van Abbemuseum also houses the collection of posters made by the Situationist Jacqueline de Jong in Paris during May 1968.

Administration 
Charles Esche is the director of the Van Abbemuseum.

Gallery

References

External links

 

1936 establishments in the Netherlands
Art museums and galleries in the Netherlands
Art museums established in 1936
Modern art museums
Museums in Eindhoven
Rijksmonuments in North Brabant
20th-century architecture in the Netherlands